Hatton House, also known as the 1892 House, is a historic home located at Pomaria, Newberry County, South Carolina.  It was built about 1892, and is a two-story, frame gabled-ell cottage in a vernacular late-Italianate style. It features ornate brackets and other exterior decorative trim.

It was listed on the National Register of Historic Places in 1990.

References

Houses on the National Register of Historic Places in South Carolina
Italianate architecture in South Carolina
Houses completed in 1892
Houses in Newberry County, South Carolina
National Register of Historic Places in Newberry County, South Carolina